Eugene School District (4J) is a public school district in the U.S. state of Oregon. It is one of two school districts that serve the city of Eugene.

Demographics
Eugene School District 4J spans  in the southern Willamette Valley, including the city of Coburg and a small part of Linn County to the north. About 85 percent of the City of Eugene lies inside 4J's boundaries.

About 16,500 students attend school in the district's 20 elementary school programs, 8 middle schools, 4 comprehensive high schools and various alternative high school programs — making it one of the most populous of Oregon's approximately 200 school districts. The five public charter schools located in the district serve about 600 additional students.

Approximately 25 percent of the student body and 10 percent of the teaching staff are members of racial/ethnic minority groups.

Nearly 50 percent of students in the Eugene School District qualify for free or reduced-price lunch, a key measure of poverty in school districts. In the 2009 school year, the district had 743 students classified as homeless by the Department of Education, or 4.2% of students in the district.

History
The district that would evolve into Eugene School District 4J started in 1854, five years before Oregon attained statehood. The district is numbered 4J because it was the fourth school district incorporated in Lane County and is a joint (J) district — its boundary includes a small part of Linn County to the north. The district's name changed in 1964, when it absorbed Coburg School (since closed), whose attendance boundary goes nearly to Harrisburg.

School district structure
Eugene School District 4J is a K–12 public school district with elementary schools serving grades K–5, middle schools serving grades 6–8, high schools serving grades 9–12, and special education transition programs up to age 21. Every residence in the district is within the attendance boundary of a neighborhood elementary, middle and high school. A majority of students attend their neighborhood schools, but the district's school choice policy allows students to enroll in a different neighborhood school or an alternative school through the school choice process, and a large percentage do so. The district also accepts enrollment from students who reside outside the district boundaries.

School choice policy
Choice is a key element of the Eugene School District, which is home to several alternative education programs (sometimes known as magnet schools, in Eugene such programs are called "alternative schools") including five language immersion programs in four languages—Spanish, Japanese, French and Chinese. The district's sometimes-controversial open school choice policy means that families who live in the district may enroll their children in any 4J school, provided there is space available. Most parents choose to have their children attend the neighborhood school near their home, but others elect to enroll their children in a different neighborhood school or in an alternative school. For students requesting enrollment in a school other than their own neighborhood school, open slots are granted in an order determined by the district's annual school choice lottery.

School programs

Alternative schools and language immersion
Among the district's 20 elementary schools, five schools immerse the students in a foreign language for half or all of the day: River Road/El Camino del Rio Spanish/English dual immersion, Buena Vista Spanish immersion, Yujin Gakuen Japanese immersion, Charlemagne French immersion and, starting in fall 2017, a Mandarin Chinese language immersion program. Language immersion offerings continue K–12, allowing students to continue their intensive Spanish, French or Japanese programs through middle school and high school. The Chinese immersion program launching in 2017 is planned to grow to continue through middle and high school. The district also has two non-language-immersion alternative (magnet) elementary schools that have no neighborhood catchment area and enroll students solely by request and lottery placement: Corridor Elementary School and Family School. Eugene International High School offers programs within three of the district's four regional high schools — Churchill, Sheldon and South Eugene.

Elementary schools
The Eugene School District's elementary schools serve grades K–5. Full-day kindergarten is provided in all of the district's elementary schools.

Adams Elementary School
Awbrey Park Elementary School
Bertha Holt Elementary School
Buena Vista Spanish Immersion Elementary School 
Camas Ridge Community Elementary School
César E. Chávez Elementary School
Charlemagne French Immersion Elementary School
Chinese Immersion Elementary School (opened fall 2017)
Edgewood Community Elementary School
Edison Elementary School
Family School
Gilham Elementary School
Howard Elementary School
McCornack Elementary School
River Road/El Camino del Río Elementary School 
Neighborhood elementary school offering Spanish/English dual immersion program 
Spring Creek Elementary School
Twin Oaks Elementary School
Willagillespie Elementary School
Yujin Gakuen Japanese Immersion Elementary School
Roughly translated from Japanese, the name means "happy garden of learning"

Note: Coburg, Crest Drive, Meadowlark and Parker Elementary Schools were closed in 2011, and a number of other schools previously closed over decades of declining enrollment after the Baby Boom.

Middle schools
The Eugene School District's middle-level school model is middle schools serving grades 6, 7 and 8.

Arts & Technology Academy 
Was Located in the former Jefferson Middle School building until fall 2017
Neighborhood middle school, grades 6–8 (previously a K–8 school)
Oregon Model STEM Lab School, with STEM/STEAM studies (science, technology, engineering, (art) & math) infused throughout curriculum
Cal Young Middle School
Named for Cal Young, prominent pioneer of Eugene, Oregon, and first head football coach of the University of Oregon
Founded in 1953
New school building opened in 2006
Kelly Middle School
Named for WWII pilot Colin Kelly
Hosts middle level of K–12 Spanish immersion program in North Eugene region
Hosts middle level of K–12 Japanese immersion program in North Eugene region
Kennedy Middle School
Named for President John F. Kennedy
Future home of middle level of K–12 Chinese immersion program in Eugene's Churchill region
Madison Middle School
Named for President James Madison
Monroe Middle School
Named for President James Monroe
Hosts middle level of K–12 Spanish immersion program in Eugene's Sheldon region
Roosevelt Middle School
Named for President Theodore Roosevelt
Hosts middle level of K–12 French immersion program in South Eugene region
New school building opened in 2016
Spencer Butte Middle School
Named for a geographical feature of the region

High schools
The Eugene School District includes four comprehensive regional high schools and some alternative programs at the high school level.

Churchill High School (1966) serves the southwest portion of Eugene, as well as rural areas south and west of the city. North Eugene (1957) serves the River Road and Santa Clara neighborhoods northwest of the city center. Sheldon (1963) students come from the Coburg Road area north of downtown Eugene, as well as the city of Coburg and the rural area in between. South Eugene (1901), formerly Eugene High, is the district's oldest high school. It serves the area of Eugene south and east of the downtown area and the University of Oregon.

Churchill High School
Listed as one of America's Best High Schools (Silver Medal) by U.S. News & World Report and Newsweek
North Eugene High School
Nationally recognized as one of America's Best High Schools (Bronze Medal) by U.S. News & World Report 
Sheldon High School 
Nationally recognized in Newsweeks annual list of the nation's best public high schools of the year in 2010
South Eugene High School
Listed as one of America's Best High Schools (Silver Medal) by U.S. News & World Report and Newsweek
Eugene International High School
Transition Education Network, formerly Life Skills Network
Eugene Education Options

Charter schools
The district also sponsors five public charter schools, which receive public funds but operate independently of the school district: Coburg Community Charter School, Ridgeline Montessori Public Charter School, The Village School, Network Charter School, and Twin Rivers Charter School.

Ridgeline Montessori, a K–8 program founded in 2000 as one of Oregon's first charter schools, is a publicly funded school based on Montessori educational philosophy and methods. The Village School, also founded in 2000, describes itself as a holistic, arts-integrated program inspired by Waldorf education. The school board approved a charter for Coburg Community Charter School after Coburg Elementary School, the public school which had existed in the small town of Coburg since the mid-1800s, was closed in 2011 due to low enrollment and a statewide school budget crisis. The curriculum of the Network Charter School, in downtown Eugene, is drawn from an alliance of local businesses and non-profits. Twin Rivers Charter School is the fifth and newest program chartered in the Eugene School District, in operation since 2014. It serves students ages 14–19 in an experiential school environment.

Administration
Cyndey Vandercar has served as superintendent of Eugene School District 4J since July 2020.

The Board of Directors has seven members elected from the district at large to serve four-year terms; board members serve without pay. The school board serves as the policy-making body of the school district. The Eugene School Board selects the superintendent as the district's executive officer and delegates the responsibility for implementing its policies and plans to the superintendent. The board also has the annual responsibility of adopting a balanced school district budget, developed in a budget process along with seven appointed citizen members of the district's budget committee.

The school board meets in regular public sessions at the 4J Education Center, 200 North Monroe, Eugene. Special meetings and work sessions are scheduled as necessary. All regular board meetings are broadcast live on the district's radio station, KRVM-AM 1280, and audio recordings are posted to the district's website. The school board encourages public input. Comments on items that are not on the board's agenda may be made at the beginning of each meeting. Audience members who wish to speak may sign up at the beginning of the meeting. Comments also may be sent to the board via email.Board members for 2019–2020 school year:'''
Alicia Hays
Gordon Lafer
Anne Marie Levis
Judy Newman
Martina Shabram
Jim Torrey
Mary Walston

See also
Bethel School District
List of school districts in Oregon
Marist High School

Footnotes

Further reading

 Joseph Schafer, "An Historical Survey of Public Education in Eugene, Oregon," Oregon Historical Quarterly,'' vol. 2, whole no. 5 (March 1901), pp. 55–77.

External links
 

School districts in Oregon
Education in Eugene, Oregon
1854 establishments in Oregon Territory
School districts established in 1854